The 1891–92 international cricket season was from September 1891 to April 1892.

Season overview

January

England in Australia

March

England in South Africa

References

International cricket competitions by season
1891 in cricket
1892 in cricket